Hajjiabad (also Romanized as Ḩājjīābād) is a village in Sardasht Rural District, in the Central District of Lordegan County, Chaharmahal and Bakhtiari Province, Iran. At the 2006 census, its population was 184, in 31 families.

References 

Populated places in Lordegan County